District 4 of the Texas Senate is a senatorial district that serves all of Chambers and Jefferson counties, and portions of Galveston, Harris, and Montgomery counties in the southeastern portion of the state of Texas.  The current Senator from District 4 is Brandon Creighton, the winner of a special election held on August 5, 2014, to succeed the resigning Tommy Williams.

Election history 
Election history of District 4 from 1992.

Most recent election

2014 (special election on August 5)

Brandon Creighton (Republican) 15,232 (67.38%) 
Steve Toth (Republican) 7,373 (32.61%)

Previous elections

2020

2016

2014 (special election on August 5)

Brandon Creighton (Republican) 15,232 (67.38%) 
Steve Toth (Republican) 7,373 (32.61%)

2012

2008

2004

2002

1998

1994

1992

District officeholders

References

04
Chambers County, Texas
Galveston County, Texas
Harris County, Texas
Jefferson County, Texas
Montgomery County, Texas